Shady Oaks, also known as the Cheek-Twitty House, is a historic plantation house located near Warrenton, Warren County, North Carolina.

Overview
It was built about 1815, and is a tripartite Federal style frame dwelling. It consists of a rather narrow two-story central block, flanked by perpendicular two-bay wings, with one-story frame additions. It is sheathed in weatherboard, has a gable roof, and one-story shed porch.

It was listed on the National Register of Historic Places in 1976.

References 

Plantation houses in North Carolina
Houses on the National Register of Historic Places in North Carolina
Federal architecture in North Carolina
Houses completed in 1815
Houses in Warren County, North Carolina
National Register of Historic Places in Warren County, North Carolina